Zamindar was an Urdu newspaper. The founding editor of this newspaper was Maulana Zafar Ali Khan (1873 – 27 November 1956), a poet, intellectual, writer, Muslim nationalist and a supporter of the All India Muslim League's Pakistan Movement.

Pakistan movement
Zamindar was the mouthpiece of Indian Muslims, Muslim Nationalists and the Pakistan Movement during the 1920s, 1930s and 1940s. It was the most popular newspaper of Muslims of India and played a key role in crafting the journalistic traditions of Pakistan and the Urdu language. Zafar Ali Khan is named "Baba e Sahafet" ("Father of Journalism") in Pakistan. The newspaper was headquartered at Lahore and continued to publish from there after the independence of Pakistan in 1947. It faced bans several times but it continued to print and gained much popularity among the people.

See also
 Daily Inqilab (Lahore)

References

Urdu-language newspapers published in India
Pakistan Movement
Urdu-language newspapers published in Pakistan